The Senegalese records in swimming are the fastest ever performances of swimmers from Senegal, which are recognised and ratified by the Federation Senegalaise de Natation et de Sauvetage.

All records were set in finals unless noted otherwise.

Long Course (50 m)

Men

Women

Mixed relay

Short Course (25 m)

Men

Women

Mixed relay

References

Senegal
Records
Swimming